Jeff S. Volek is an American kinesiologist and low-carbohydrate diet advocate who focuses on the clinical application of ketogenic diets.

Volek obtained a MSc in Exercise Physiology in 1995 and PhD in Kinesiology from Pennsylvania State University in 1999. He is a registered dietitian.

Volek is a professor in the Department of Human Sciences at Ohio State University. He has obtained over $7 million in research grants to study the health outcomes of low-carbohydrate diets. He co-founded Virta Health Corp and serves as Chief Science Officer. As of 2023, Volek is investigating the use of ketogenic diets in brain metastases.

Volek is on the advisory board of Atkins-HCP (owned by Atkins Nutritionals) and co-authored a book promoting a modified version of the Atkins diet. Volek promotes a diet high in saturated fat and has disputed the saturated fat guidelines.

Selected publications

The Testosterone Advantage Plan (with Adam Campbell and Lou Schuler, 2002)
Men's Health TNT Diet (with Adam Campbell, 2008)
New Atkins For a New You (with Eric C. Westman and Stephen D. Phinney, 2010)
The Art and Science of Low Carbohydrate Living (with Stephen D. Phinney, 2011)
The Art and Science of Low Carbohydrate Performance (with Stephen D. Phinney, 2012)

References

21st-century American non-fiction writers
21st-century American physicians
American health and wellness writers
Dietitians
Living people
Low-carbohydrate diet advocates
Ohio State University faculty
Pennsylvania State University alumni